Tianzhu may refer to:

Locations in China
Mount Tianzhu, in Anhui
Tianzhu County, Guizhou, in Qiandongnan Miao and Dong Autonomous Prefecture, Guizhou
Tenzhu Tibetan Autonomous County, or Tianzhu, in Wuwei, Gansu
Tianzhu, Beijing, an area of Shunyi District, Beijing

Other uses
Tianzhu (Chinese name of God), the name of God used by Catholic Chinese
Tianzhu (India), an old Chinese name for the Indian subcontinent